"Verdict of Three" was an American television play broadcast on April 24, 1958, as part of the second season of the CBS television series Playhouse 90. James P. Cavanagh wrote the teleplay based on the 1940 novel, Verdict of Twelve by Raymond Postgate. Buzz Kulik directed and Martin Manulis produced. Michael Wilding, Angela Lansbury, and Yvonne De Carlo starred.

Plot
Marina Arkwritght is put on trial for allegedly poisoning her son. Three of the jurors have prejudices that they bring to the case.

Cast
The following performers received screen credit for their performances:

 Michael Wilding - Sir John Alexander (defense attorney)
 Angela Lansbury - Victoria Atkins (juror)
 Yvonne De Carlo - Marina Arkwright (the accused)
 Gladys Cooper - Mrs. Allen
 Cecil Kellaway - Dr. Parkes
 Carmen Mathews - Alice Morris
 Rod Taylor - Francis Allen

References

1958 television plays
1958 American television episodes
Playhouse 90 (season 2) episodes